Gui Chaoran (born 8 January 1976) is a Chinese former volleyball player who competed in the 2000 Summer Olympics.

References

1976 births
Living people
Chinese women's volleyball players
Olympic volleyball players of China
Volleyball players at the 2000 Summer Olympics